Transcarpathia may refer to:

Place 
 relative term, designating any region beyond the Carpathians (lat. trans- / beyond, over), depending on a point of observation
 Romanian Transcarpathia, designation for Romanian regions on the inner or outer side of Carpathian Mountains, depending on a point of observation
 Ruthenian Transcarpathia, designation for Ruthenian regions on the inner or outer side of Carpathian Mountains, depending on a point of observation
 Ukrainian Transcarpathia or Transcarpathian Ukraine, designation for a Ukrainian region beyond the Carpathian Mountains, including:
 Ukrainian Transcarpathia (1918-1919), short-lived unification project and claim of the West Ukrainian People's Republic
 Ukrainian Transcarpathia (1938-1939), an autonomous region, and in 1939 a short-lived unrecognized republic known as "Carpathian Ukraine"
 Transcarpathian Oblast (or Zakarpattian Oblast), an administrative unit of Ukraine, covering Ukrainian Transcarpathian region

Other 
 Transcarpathian Art Institute in the city of Uzhhorod, Ukraine 
 Transkarpatia, the fifth album by the Polish symphonic black metal band Darzamat

See also 
 Carpathia (disambiguation)
 Carpathian (disambiguation)
 Subcarpathia (disambiguation)
 Subcarpathian (disambiguation)
 Outer Subcarpathia, the depression area at the outer base of the Carpathian arc
 Inner Subcarpathia, the depression area at the inner base of the Carpathian arc
 Zakarpattia (disambiguation)